Susan Shur-Fen Gau  (born 1962), also known as Susan Gau, Shur-Fen Gau, Gau Shur-Fen and in Chinese:高淑芬,  is a Taiwanese psychiatrist and academic with specialized in psychiatry, psychology, epidemiology, preventive medicine, occupational therapy, and brain and mind sciences.

She is known for her perseverance and dedication to research into possible cures for mental disorders and to defense the rights for children and adolescents with mental illnesses and to clarify confusions and misunderstandings of pediatric psychiatry, and currently working as President, director, medical doctor, professor, vice-President, and a member at Taiwanese Society of Child and Adolescent Psychiatry, Department of medical genetics of National Taiwan University Hospital, National Taiwan University Hospital, National Taiwan University, IACAPAP, and Taiwanese Psychiatric Association respectively.

Early life
She was born and raised at Wanhua District, Taipei City where her home was located, also the place where her parents made products of mark models. By this time, she and her siblings had to assist their parents to get the production work done. Due to this reason, she had to take care of many aspects of life which, she said, ended up making her a person with good sense of time management.

Education and Career
She graduated from Yale University in 2001 with degrees in epidemiology and Ph.D.

As being a President of Taiwanese Society of Child and Adolescent Psychiatry and an important member in Taiwanese Psychiatric Association, she has been making effort to improve medical environment regarding psychiatry which in turn benefited  not just much pediatricians but also thousands of patients and their families.

Patient right defense

Explanations to cease the tide of anti-psychiatry
In 2016, a conference was announced to be held on April in Taiwanese Legislative Yuan by a member of parliament and some people without background in psychiatry and some of whom were thought linked to Scientology, aiming to "'find new ways concerning the ADHD treatment' while questioning the validity of the present regimen pattern".

In the wake of this coming conference with its potential outcomes that could lead to ban on the use of methylphenidate which is the first-line medication used to treat primary symptoms of ADHD, she along with her colleagues and patients with their families coming all the way from corners of Taiwan stood out to demand the invitations from the MP, saying "how could a conference discussing the future of those with mental illnesses not involve trained specialists?" Subsequently, they gained access to the conferences and have their say during the conference. After all, the rights of children and adolescents with ADHD were successfully protected on grounds of Evidence-Based Medicine.

Clarifications made in response to propaganda by media in 2015 
In 2015, Central News Agency reported a study conducted by Michigan University that triggered a series of panic among the families in Taiwan.

In order to clarify the elicited misunderstandings, she held a news conference to reiterate the current practice of medicine and guaranteed the safety of the treatments so that those affected no longer became socially stigmatized.

Bids to let those needing help gain further protections medically and socially
May fifth, 2017, a convention in the Legislative Yuan whose topic was to reflect on and review whether or not the primary health care providers are adequately resourced and the outlook of the policy making.

Over the convention, she and her partners along  campaigned for further rights and protections for the weak often those who were born with disability and poverty and called for the people to abolish prejudice against people suffering mental disorders.

Research
She is one of the pioneers in Taiwan that started Taiwan-based research and enrolled local patients to the domestic clinical trials.
Since then, Taiwanese patients' statistics were involved in many secondary thesis such as meta-analysis and systematic reviews.

Much of the research she was involved in was cited into the ADHD article on Chinese Wikipedia and are expected to continuously influence East Asian cultural sphere whose native language is Chinese and the world.

Her most recent research debuted second half of 2017 revealed that nearly one-third of people below 18 years old in Taiwan suffered mental illnesses that need professional assistance. "The proportion (prevalence) was slightly less than the United States but consistent with which in Europe.", she said during the press conference subsequent to the release of the study.

Notable publications
To date, as of late November, 2017, she has led her team members publish a series of mental illness' general information called 【Doctors from NTUH visiting my home】 in the hope of spreading the general knowledge about mental illnesses to the general public to provoke people's awareness.

Two books within the series were written by herself which are 【Having a Child with Attention Deficit Hyperactivity Disorder】, 【Attention! A Complete Guide for Adult ADHD】.

Published researches involved

2019

2018

</ref>

See also
List of psychiatrists

References

Books

External links
 Shur-Fen Gau at National Taiwan University Hospital Department of Psychiatry 
 Susan Gau research team's official channel on YouTube (in Chinese)
  

1962 births
Living people
Attention deficit hyperactivity disorder researchers
Autism researchers
Child psychiatrists
Academic staff of the National Taiwan University
Scientists from Taipei
Taiwanese psychiatrists
Taiwanese women physicians
Women psychiatrists
Yale University alumni